Çayhan is a town in Ereğli district of Konya Province, Turkey.

References 

Populated places in Konya Province
Towns in Turkey
Ereğli (Konya) District